Laurens van Lieren (born 21 December 1981) is a Dutch dressage rider who competed at the 2005 and 2007 European Championships where he won team silver and gold. He competed also at the World Equestrian Games in Aachen 2006 where he won team silver with his horse Hexagon's Ollright.

He is well known as a sport commentator at the NOS and sport director at CHIO Rotterdam.

References

External links
https://data.fei.org/Person/Performance.aspx?personFeiID=10015868

Living people
1981 births
Dutch male equestrians
Dutch dressage riders
Sportspeople from Goes
21st-century Dutch people